The 2018 ABA League Supercup was the second tournament of the ABA League Supercup, featuring teams from the Adriatic League First Division.

Qualified teams
Based on the results in the 2017–18 ABA League First Division season there are 8 participants at the 2018 Adriatic Supercup. Eighth team is the host. Qualified teams are the seven best placed teams of the season and the host.

Venue

Bracket
Source: ABA League

Quarterfinals

Mornar v Partizan NIS

Budućnost VOLI v Igokea

Cedevita v Zadar

Crvena zvezda mts v Petrol Olimpija

Semifinals

Partizan NIS v Budućnost VOLI

Cedevita v Crvena zvezda mts

Final

See also 
 2018–19 ABA League First Division

References

External links 
 Official website

Supercup 2017
2018–19 in Croatian basketball
2018–19 in Serbian basketball
2018–19 in Slovenian basketball
2018–19 in Montenegrin basketball
Adriatic
International basketball competitions hosted by Bosnia and Herzegovina